The 2012 Georgia Southern Eagles football team represented Georgia Southern University in the 2012 NCAA Division I FCS football season. They were led by third-year head coach Jeff Monken and played their home games at Paulson Stadium. They were a member of the Southern Conference. They finished the season 10–4, 6–2 in SoCon play to claim a share of the conference championship with Appalachian State and Wofford. They received the SoCon's automatic bid into the FCS Playoffs where they defeated Central Arkansas in the second round and Old Dominion in the quarterfinals before falling to North Dakota State in the semifinals. That would turn out to be Georgia Southern's final FCS playoff game, as they announced they were moving to FBS and the Sun Belt Conference in 2014.

Schedule

Ranking movements

References

Georgia Southern
Georgia Southern Eagles football seasons
Southern Conference football champion seasons
Georgia Southern
Georgia Southern Eagles football